C. marginatum may refer to:
 Caecum marginatum, a sea snail species
 Clinostomum marginatum, the yellow grub, a parasitic fluke species found in many freshwater fish in North America

See also 
 Marginatum (disambiguation)